The 2022 V.League 1, known as the Night Wolf V.League 1 for sponsorship reasons, was the 66th professional season of the top-flight football league in Vietnam. The season started on 25 February 2022, and ended on 20 November.

There was no defending champion as a result of the previous season being abandoned due to the COVID-19 pandemic.

There was a break from 14 March until 2 July to accommodate for the 2022 FIFA World Cup qualification and the delayed 2021 Southeast Asian Games.

Hanoi FC won their 6th league title on 13 November with one match to spare.

Changes from the previous season
Due to the previous season being abandoned, no teams were promoted or relegated from the 2021 season. All but one club from the 2021 season contested in the league. Than Quang Ninh were not permitted to participate due to financial reasons, leaving the league starting with just 13 clubs.

From V.League 1
Dissolved
 Than Quang Ninh

Teams

Stadiums and locations

Personnel and kits

Managerial changes

Foreign players
Players name in bold indicates the player was registered after the start of the season.

 Naturalized players whose parents or grandparents were born in Vietnam, thus are regarded as local players.
 Player withdrew from the squad due to an injury.

Standings

League table

Positions by round
This table lists the positions of teams after each week of matches.

Results

Season statistics

Top scorers

Source: Soccerway

Hat-tricks

Clean sheets

Attendances

Awards

Monthly awards

Annual awards

References

Vietnamese Super League seasons
Vietnam
2022 in Vietnamese football